Esa-Oke is a Yoruba town located at the  Obokun Local Government Area of the Ijesa North Federal Constituency of Ife/Ijesa Senatorial District of Osun State, South-West of Nigeria. It is a native Ijesa (Ijesha) community and shares boundaries with other towns namely: Oke-Imesi, Imesi-ile, Ijebu-Ijesa, Esa-Odo, Efon-Alaaye. Omiran Adebolu, a member of the Olofin family of Ile-Ife, though disputably, was believed to have founded Esa-Oke after he left Ile-Ife in 1184 A.D.

Occupation

The people of Esa-Oke were predominantly farmers who specialised in growing food crops such as Yam, Cassava, Maize, Rice and so on as well as Cash crops such as Cocoa, Kolanut and so on. However, the thrust of commerce is central to their activities and they participate in trading activities mostly across the Western and the Northern part of Nigeria.

Traditional institution

The town has at the head of its traditional governance structure, a kingship that goes with the title of the 'Owamiran of Esa-Oke'. The Ijesa North traditional Council of the Osun state Council of Obas is the umbrella body that oversees its affairs. There are four broad divisional heads reporting to the king representing : Oke-Esa, Erinjiyan, Idofin and Odo-Ese, each with a divisional chieftaincy title of: Asaba, Enurin, Odobaja and Asalu respectively.

There are four ruling houses namely:
 Ile Afinbiokin (Oba Isiaiah Adeniran's lineage, also known as Ile-Otu)
 Ile Beleyeke
 Ile Gogodudu
 Ile Yeye Owa (Oba Adeyemi Adediran's lineage).

Traditional rulers in the order of their currency are:
 Oba Adeyemi Adediran  - Atipa Owaji II - 2004 till date
 Oba Isaiah Ajayi Adeniran - Afinbiokin II-  1954 to 2004
 Oba Fatolu - XXXXXXXXXX - 1948

Politics and personalities

The town belongs to the Obokun/Oriade Federal Constituency of Osun State. It commands special respect in the politics of Osun State as a whole due to its strategic positioning. The assassinated Attorney General of the Federation and former governor of the old Oyo State, Bola Ige and other notable figures such as Adeyemi-Bero, one of the first civil servants in Lagos State, are notable citizens of the town. It also boasts of businessmen, past and present Senators and Honourables who are either presently representing or have represented the political constituency to which it belongs.

Education and social infrastructure

The town is the host community to the Osun State College of Technology (OSCOTECH), a tertiary institution of Polytechnic status, known regionally for its technological niche. There are two public secondary schools namely: Esa-Oke Grammar School and Saint Joseph's Catholic High School. On the list also are eight public primary schools. However, the town has in recent times, year 2000 to date, witnessed the establishment of some private secondary and primary schools 
with notable schools like Fayofunmi Model College, Elepolu Group Of Schools and Peace&Joy Group Of Schools. Esa-Oke is very accessible with good road network that connects to neighbouring towns and states, especially the Osun state capital, Osogbo, in just about 1 hour, 30 minutes.

Culture and tourism
The annual Egungun and Ikedi festivals are usually recreational. They feature cultural dances and huge display of historical traditional costumes including the 'Ege' dance. The mysterious 'Ayo Olopon' is also good for tourist attraction.

References

External links
Osun State College of Technology
Distance to neighbouring towns
Osun State Government

Populated places in Osun State
Towns in Yorubaland